Maryse Joissains-Masini (born 15 August 1942), also known as Maryse Charton, was the mayor of Aix-en-Provence from 2001 to 2021. She was also a member of the National Assembly of France. in which she represented the Bouches-du-Rhône department, and is a member of The Republicans party.

Biography

Early life

Maryse Charton was born 15 August 1942 in Toulon, France. Her parents were both Communists, and her father was Maurice Thorez's bodyguard. She worked for the Social Security in France and volunteered as a young communist. She then received a BA degree from the University of the South, Toulon-Var followed by a master's degree and a PhD from Aix-Marseille University.

Career
She subsequently taught criminology and private law at Aix-Marseille University. In 1968, she married Alain Joissains. In 1970, she started her career as a lawyer. She worked in the cases of the Infected blood scandal and the use of asbestos. It was also then that she became a follower of Jean-Jacques Servan-Schreiber and joined the Radical Party.

From 1983 to 1989, she was a member of the regional council of Provence-Alpes-Côte d'Azur. She has been the Mayor of Aix-en-Provence since 2001. She signed a law criminalizing drunkenness in public, a move aimed at the area's homeless people. In 2009, her re-election was invalidated by a former councilor, Stéphane Salord, under the assumption that allegations spread about her opponent François-Xavier de Peretti were too personal and violent. Nevertheless, she was re–elected. In June 2011, she voted against same-sex marriage. She has been accused of not attending the sessions in the National Assembly of France. However, she responded by saying she was in attendance once a month. She is among the French politicians who hold the most elected positions at different levels of government. She is a recipient of the Legion of Honour.

Shortly after François Hollande was elected president in 2012, she suggested that he might be "illegitimate", arguing that the entire French media and labor unions supported him and unfairly criticized Nicolas Sarkozy's tenure, and she asked the Constitutional Council of France to annul the election results; however, she was rebuffed.

Personal life 
Her former husband, Alain Joissains, was the mayor of Aix-en-Provence from 1978 to 1983. Now divorced, their daughter Sophie Joissains was a member of the French Senate and mayor of Aix-en-Provence since 2021.

References

External links

Official website

´

1942 births
Living people
Politicians from Toulon
Radical Party (France) politicians
Union for a Popular Movement politicians
The Popular Right
The Republicans (France) politicians
Mayors of Aix-en-Provence
Recipients of the Legion of Honour
Women mayors of places in France
20th-century French women politicians
21st-century French women politicians
Women members of the National Assembly (France)
Deputies of the 12th National Assembly of the French Fifth Republic
Deputies of the 13th National Assembly of the French Fifth Republic